Greyfield may refer to:

 Greyfield (band), a rock band from Jacksonville, Florida
 Greyfield (Camden County, Georgia), an estate on Cumberland Island, listed on the NRHP in Georgia
 Greyfield land, also greyfields, underused real estate assets, typically with empty asphalt areas